Agyneta prosectes is a species of sheet weaver found in Africa and Saint Helena. It was described by Locket in 1968.

References

prosectes
Spiders of Africa
Spiders described in 1968